Arts South Australia (previously Arts SA) was responsible for managing the South Australian Government's funding for the arts and cultural heritage from about 1996 until late 2018, when it was progressively dismantled, a process complete by early 2019. Most of its functions were taken over by the Department of the Premier and Cabinet under Premier Steven Marshall.

History
Arts SA was created primarily as a funding body around 1996, at which time it fell under the Department of Transport, Urban Planning and the Arts (DTUPA). It was responsible for the development of and funding for the arts sector within South Australia, and was responsible for nine statutory corporations and a number of not-for-profit arts organisations.

During the period of its existence, Ministers for the Arts were:
 Diana Laidlaw (1993–2002)
 Mike Rann (5 March 2002 – 21 October 2011), while also serving as Premier
 John Hill (21 October 2011 – 21 January 2013)
 Jay Weatherill (21 January 2013 – 26 March 2014), while also serving as Premier
 Jack Snelling (26 March 2014 – 17 September 2017)
 Jay Weatherill (18 September 2017 - March 2018), while also serving as Premier
 Premier Steven Marshall was responsible for the portfolio since being elected in March 2018. After August 2018, responsibilities were dispersed (see below).

Chief executives included:
Timothy O'Loughlin (1997?–2000) (afterwards promoted to CEO of DTUPA)
Kathie Massey (December 2000 – 2004)
Greg Mackie (2004–2008)
Alexandra Reid (2009–2015)
Peter Louca (2010–2018)

In September 1997 Arts Minister Laidlaw and then new CEO O'Louglin completely restructured Arts SA. Previously, it had operated under art form divisions, but the new structure created three divisions: arts leadership, professional development and emerging artists; cultural tourism and export; and the development of new commissions, events and festivals.

From 2015 until August 2018, Arts South Australia was headed by Peter Louca, former chief of staff to Minister Jack Snelling and one-time Labor Party candidate for the federal seat of Mayo. Peter Louca instigated the re-branding of Arts SA to Arts South Australia in 2016.

In 2016, following significant federal funding cuts experienced by several South Australian small to medium arts organisations, Arts South Australia was criticised by Arts Industry Council for South Australia for not providing enough financial support to the independent arts sector. In 2016 Arts South Australia operated with a budget of $140 million, less than one percent of the state budget. It was then a division of the Department of State Development, overseen by the Minister for the Arts. In 2016 Arts South Australia established the campaign "Made In Adelaide" to export and promote South Australian artists at the Edinburgh Fringe Festival.

Responsibilities

Arts South Australia until 2018
Statutory Authorities reporting to the Arts South Australia were:
Adelaide Festival Corporation
Adelaide Festival Centre Trust
Art Gallery of South Australia
Carrick Hill
Country Arts SA
History Trust of South Australia
South Australian Film Corporation
South Australian Museum
State Library of South Australia
State Opera of South Australia
State Theatre Company of South Australia

Other organisations under their umbrella included:
Adelaide Film Festival
Carclew (centre for youth performing arts development)
JamFactory
Music SA (formerly AusMusicSA, established 23 July 1997)
The  Music Development Office (MDO), responsible for the management of the Contemporary Music Grants Program and the Jon Lemon Artist-in-Residence Program, as well as a number of other grants.  
Patch Theatre Company
Windmill Theatre Company

Other responsibilities included:
The South Australian Ruby Awards (from 2006), which recognise outstanding achievement in South Australia's arts and culture sector.
Management of Australia's oldest intact mainland theatre, The Queens Theatre (2010–2018; then taken over by GWB McFarlane Theatres).

August 2018 transfers and creations

DoE
To the Department of Education:
Carclew 
History Trust of South Australia
Patch Theatre Company
Windmill Theatre Company

Dept Innovation & Skills
To the Department of Innovation and Skills (previously Department of State Development):
South Australian Film Corporation
Adelaide Film Festival
JamFactory
Music SA
Music Development Office 
GamePlus (new - for the video game industry)

DPC

Responsibility for the eleven statutory authorities (listed above) were transferred to the Arts and Culture section within the Department of the Premier and Cabinet (DPC).
DPC also provides funding to:
 Australian Dance Theatre
Adelaide Fringe
Adelaide Symphony Orchestra
Tandanya National Aboriginal Cultural Institute
Management of the following awards:
The Ruby Awards
Made in Adelaide Awards (for Adelaide Fringe artists)

The biennial Adelaide Festival Awards for Literature are managed by the State Library of South Australia (which is under the DPC).

Online grants portal

, the Arts South Australia online portal  is still being used for managing grant applications.

Notes

References

Further reading
Arts and culture Home page for DPC Arts and culture section, successor to Arts South Australia
Arts Industry Council of South Australia

South Australia
Government departments of South Australia
Year of establishment missing
Arts in South Australia